The  Lighthouse is an active lighthouse located at the south entrance of the Port of Livorno in Tuscany on the Ligurian Sea.

History
The lighthouse's name Fanale dei Pisani comes from the Pisans who built it in 1303. The project is attributed to Giovanni Pisano and master builders Rocco Entello De Spina and Bonaggiunta Ciabatti, whose names were found engraved on a stone.
The lighthouse was built on an emerging rock surrounded by the sea at the south entrance of the harbor. The structure of the lighthouse is formed by a polygonal basement of 13 sides. Over everything is a tower formed by two cylinders. Each cylinder has an embattled balcony and a lantern at the top. The structure consists of 11 floors connected to each other by a  spiral staircase. The lower part of the lighthouse is made of four cylinders of decreasing diameter. The upper part of the lighthouse is made of three cylinders which results in the tower becoming thinner toward the summit.

The lighthouse was originally built with white Verruca stone from San Giuliano cave near Pisa. Oil lamps were initially used for the light and were then replaced by compressed oil. In 1841, Fresnel lens were installed and acetylene gas lamp were used. At the end of the 1800s, the installation was electrified. Ferdinando I de' Medici, Grand Duke of Tuscany ordered the construction of warehouses in the basement in 1584, which were later transformed into Lazzaretto di San Rocco and a shipbuilding yard. In 1911, the lighthouse passed under the jurisdiction of the Italian Navy where it remains to this day.

The tower was intact until June 20, 1944, when the German troops blew it up as the Allied approached. The Fanale was rebuilt in June 1954 according to the original project with material recovered from the ruins and from the San Giuliano cave. It was made from reinforced concrete 30 centimeters thick and covered externally by stone. The new lighthouse was inaugurated on September 16, 1956, by President Giovanni Gronchi on the 350th anniversary of Livorno's proclamation as a city.

Description
The tower is covered by grey stone and the lantern dome is painted grey metallic. The lighthouse is completely automated, as the last keeper Renzo Fiorentini left, and managed by the Marina Militare with the identification code number 1896 E.F.

See also
 List of lighthouses in Italy

References

External links

 Servizio Fari Marina Militare 

Livorno
Lighthouses in Italy
Buildings and structures in Livorno
Lighthouses in Tuscany